Horace Harvey was a South African international lawn bowler.

Bowls career
In 1938 he won the gold medal in the singles event at the 1938 British Empire Games.

He was a 1937 singles National Champion bowling for the Brakpan Bowls Club, Guateng.

Personal life
His father was Andrew Harvey who competed in the 1934 British Empire Games and his son was Tommy Harvey, a winner of two medals at the 1972 World Outdoor Bowls Championship.

References

South African male bowls players
Commonwealth Games gold medallists for South Africa
Bowls players at the 1938 British Empire Games
Commonwealth Games medallists in lawn bowls
Medallists at the 1938 British Empire Games